Chad Jones (born 1984) is an Australian footballer.

Chad Jones can also refer to:

Charles I. Jones, American economist who developed the Jones model 
Chad Jones (American football) (born 1988), American football player
Chad Jones (rapper) (born 1984), American rapper